is a Japanese retired kickboxer, who competed in the super featherweight division of AJKF, where he was the Super Featherweight champion, as well as in the super featherweight and lightweight divisions of Krush.

Kickboxing career

AJKF super featherweight champion
Ishikawa was booked to face Naoki Maeda for the AJKF Super Featherweight championship at AJKF New Year Kick Festival 2006 on January 4, 2006. He won the fight by a first-round technical knockout. The bout was stopped on the advice of the ringside physician, as Maeda suffered a forehead injury due to an elbow strike.

Ishikawa faced Dedduan Por.Jarunchai in a non-title bout at AJKF SWORD FIGHT 2006 on March 19, 2006. He won the closely contested fight by majority decision. Two judges scored the bout 49–48 in his favor, while the third judge scored it as an even 50–50 draw. Ishikawa next faced Susumu Daiguji, in another non-title bout, at AJKF CROSSOVER on May 14, 2006. He lost the fight by majority decision, with two scorecards of 29–28 and one of 28–28. Ishikawa was knocked down with a right hook in the first round.

Ishikawa made his first AJFK super featherweight title defense against Masami at AJKF Spear of Destiny on July 23, 2006. He won the fight by a first-round technical knockout, after managing to knock Masami down three times by the 2:24 minute mark of the opening round.

Ishikawa faced the MA Japan super featherweight champion Ichiro Otaka at AJKF Seishun Matsuri 〜Naokick's〜 on October 8, 2006. He won the fight by unanimous decision, with scores of 50–46, 50–46 and 50–45. Ishikawa next faced Wanlop Weerasakreck at AJKF New Year Kick Festival 2007 on January 4, 2007. The fight was ruled a draw by majority decision, with one judge scoring the fight 49–48 for Wanlop, while the remaining two judges scored the fight an even 49–49. Ishikawa was booked to face the J-Network lightweight champion Ryuji Kajiwara in a non-title bout at AJKF New Deal on April 15, 2007. The fight was ruled a majority decision draw, with two judges scoring it as a 50–50 and 49–49 draw respectively, while the third judge scored it 50–49 for Kawajiri.

Ishikawa made his first and only Rajadamnern Stadium appearance on June 17, 2007, against Chagnwitnoi Sitchanwit. He won the fight by a third-round technical knockout. Ishikawa was next scheduled to participate in the AJKF lightweight tournament. He faced Takehiro Murahama in the quarterfinal bout, which was held on August 25, 2007. He won the fight by unanimous decision, with scores of 50–48, 50–48 and 50–49. Ishikawa faced Masahiro Yamamoto in the tournament quarterfinals on October 25, 2007. He lost the fight by unanimous decision.

Ishikawa faced Fire Harada at AJKF New Year Kick Festival 2008 on January 4, 2008, in his first fight of the year. He won the fight by a second-round knockout. Ishikawa next faced Shuichi Akabane at AJKF CUB☆KICK'S-9 on February 9, 2008. He won the fight by unanimous decision. Ishikawa was expected to fight again in March 2008, but was later ruled out due to injury. Ishikawa instead made his return to competition at AJKF Spring Storm on April 26, 2008, when he faced the former AJKF featherweight champion Genki Yamamoto. He won the fight by a third-round technical knockout. The fight was stopped at the 2:37 minute mark, due to a cut on Yamamoto's forehead.

Ishikawa was booked to face Kanongsuk Weerasakreck at AJKF Norainu Dengekisakusen on June 22, 2008. Kanongsuk snapped Ishikawa's three fight winning streak, as he won the fight by a fourth-round technical knockout. Ishikawa faced Phetek Sor.Suwanpakdee at AJKF SWORD FIGHT 2008 ～Japan VS Thailand～ on September 19, 2008. He lost the fight by a second-round technical knockout.

Ishikawa made his first Lumpinee Stadium appearance against Tananchai Sor.Bonchai on November 21, 2008. He won the fight by a third-round technical knockout. Ishikawa next faced Suafuanlek Sibiugarden at AJKF NEW Year Kick Festival 2009 on January 4, 2009. He won the fight by a third-round knockout. His two fight winning streak was snapped by Haruaki Otsuki at AJKF Krush 2 on March 14, 2009, who beat him by a third-round knockout. He rebounded from this loss by beating Daisuke Uematsu by a unanimous decision, after an extra round was fought, at AJKF Krush 3 on May 17, 2009.

Ishikawa made his second AJKF super featherweight title defense against Naoki Maeda at AJKF Norainu Dengekisakusen 2009 on June 21, 2009. The pair previously met on January 4, 2006, with Ishikawa winning by a first-round technical knockout. The fight was ruled a majority decision draw, with two judges scoring the fight an even 49–49 draw, while the third judge scored it 49–48 for Ishikawa.

Krush
Ishikawa made his Krush debut against TURBO at Krush Lightweight Grand Prix 2009 ～Round 2～ on August 14, 2009, in the opening round of the lightweight tournament. Ishikawa faced his quarterfinal opponent Yosuke Mizuochi on the same day, and won the bout by a first-round knockout. He won the fight by a third-round knockout, stopping TURBO with a head kick with 15 seconds left in the bout. Ishikawa faced Yuji Takeuchi in the semifinals of the 2009 Krush Lightweight Grand Prix 2009 on November 2, 2009, in his final fight of the year. He won the bout by a second-round knockout. He wouldn't advance to the tournament semifinal however, as he was forced to withdraw due to a cut above his left eye.

Ishikawa had his five-fight undefeated streak snapped by John Denis at Krush.5 on January 4, 2010, who won beat him by a first-round knockout. Despite this loss, Ishikawa was booked to take part in the K-1 Japan lightweight grand prix. He faced Yuto Watanabe in the first round of the tournament, held on May 2, 2010. Ishikawa won the fight by unanimous decision, with all three judges scoring the fight 30–29 in his favor. Ishikawa advanced to the tournament semifinals, held on July 5, 2010, where he faced Kizaemon Saiga. Saiga won the fight by unanimous decision.

Ishikawa returned to Krush for his final two fights of the year. Ishikawa faced Ryuji Kajiwara at Krush.9 on August 14, 2010. He lost the fight by unanimous decision, with two scores of 29–27 and one of 30–27. Ishikawa was next booked to face Hirotaka Urabe at Krush -60 kg Inaugural Championship Tournament -First Round- on December 12, 2010. Urabe won the fight by unanimous decision.

Ishikawa faced Makoto Morishige at Krush -70kg inaugural Championship Tournament ~First Round~ on May 29, 2011. He won the fight by a second-round technical knockout. After he successfully rebounded from his three-fight losing streak, Ishikawa was booked to challenge the reigning WBC Muaythai super featherweight champion Yoshinori Nakasuka at NJKF NEW JAPAN BLOOD 7 on July 17, 2011. He lost the fight by unanimous decision, with all three judges scoring the fight 50–46 for Nakasuka. Ishikawa re-matched Yuji Takeuchi at Krush 12 on September 24, 2011. He won the fight by technical decision. The fight was stopped after the second round, due to a cut above Ishikawa's right eye. He was awarded the unanimous decision, with all three judges scoring the bout 18–17 in his favor.

Ishikawa was booked to challenge the reigning Krush Super Featherweight champion Hirotaka Urabe at Krush.15 on January 9, 2012. The fight was ruled a draw by majority decision. After falling short in his first title bid, Ishikawa rebounded with two consecutive victories. He first beat Kan Itabashi by unanimous decision at Krush 19 on June 8, 2012, which he followed up with a unanimous decision win against Shota Saenchaigym at Krush 23 on October 8, 2012. This two fight winning streak earned him the chance to challenge Hirotaka Urabe for the Krush super featherweight title for a second time at Krush.25 ～TEAM DRAGON 10th Anniversary～ on December 14, 2012. The fight was once again ruled a draw, this time by split decision.

Ishikawa fought five more times, following his second failed title bid. He first beat Junpei Aotsu by unanimous decision, after an extra round was fought, at Krush Grand Prix 2013 on January 14, 2013. This was followed by a third-round technical knockout loss to Xavier Bastard at Krush.29 on June 16, 2013, a draw against Shota Kanbe at Krush.33 on September 21, 2013, who would beat him by majority decision at Krush.34 on November 10, 2013. Ishikawa would suffer two more losses in 2014. He first lost to Keisuke Nakamura at Krush.36 on January 4, 2014, who beat him by unanimous decision, while his second loss came against Go Kato at Krush.40 on April 15, 2014.

Ishikawa officially announced his retirement from professional competition on June 25, 2015.

Titles and accomplishments
All Japan Kickboxing Federation
 2006 AJKF Super Featherweight championship
Two successful title defenses

IKUSA
 2005 IKUSA Grand Prix -60kg runner-up

Professional kickboxing record

|-  style="background:#fbb;"
| 2014-04-15|| Loss||align=left| Go Kato || Krush.40 || Tokyo, Japan || TKO (Punches)|| 1 || 1:28
|-  style="background:#fbb;"
| 2014-01-04|| Loss||align=left| Keisuke Nakamura || Krush.36 || Tokyo, Japan || Decision (Unanimous)|| 3 || 3:00
|-  style="background:#fbb;"
| 2013-11-10|| Loss||align=left| Shota Kanbe || Krush.34 || Tokyo, Japan || Decision (Majority)|| 3 || 3:00
|-  style="background:#c5d2ea;"
| 2013-09-21|| Draw ||align=left| Shota Kanbe || Krush.33 || Tokyo, Japan || Technical decision (Unanimous) || 3 || 3:00
|-  style="background:#fbb;"
| 2013-06-16|| Loss||align=left| Xavier Bastard || Krush.29 || Tokyo, Japan || TKO (Referee stoppage)|| 3 || 2:48
|-  style="background:#cfc;"
| 2013-01-14|| Win||align=left| Junpei Aotsu || Krush Grand Prix 2013 || Tokyo, Japan || Ext.R Decision (Unanimous)|| 4 || 3:00
|-  style="background:#c5d2ea;"
| 2012-12-14|| Draw ||align=left| Hirotaka Urabe || Krush.25 ～TEAM DRAGON 10th Anniversary～ || Tokyo, Japan || Decision (Split) || 3 || 3:00
|-
! style=background:white colspan=9 |
|-  bgcolor="#cfc"
| 2012-10-08 || Win ||align=left| Shota Saenchaigym || Krush 23 || Tokyo, Japan || Decision (unanimous) || 3 || 3:00
|-  bgcolor="#cfc"
| 2012-06-08 || Win ||align=left| Kan Itabashi || Krush 19 || Tokyo, Japan || Decision (unanimous) || 3 || 3:00
|-  style="background:#c5d2ea;"
| 2012-01-09|| Draw ||align=left| Hirotaka Urabe|| Krush.15 || Tokyo, Japan || Decision (Majority) || 3 || 3:00
|-
! style=background:white colspan=9 |
|-  bgcolor="#cfc"
| 2011-09-24 || Win ||align=left| Yuji Takeuchi || Krush 12 || Tokyo, Japan || Technical decision (unanimous) || 2 || 3:00
|-  bgcolor="#fbb"
| 2011-07-17 || Loss ||align=left| Yoshinori Nakasuka || NJKF NEW JAPAN BLOOD 7 || Tokyo, Japan || Decision (unanimous) || 5 || 3:00
|-
! style=background:white colspan=9 |
|-  bgcolor="#cfc"
| 2011-05-29 || Win ||align=left| Makoto Morishige || Krush -70kg inaugural Championship Tournament ~First Round~ || Tokyo, Japan || TKO (3 Knockdowns) || 2 || 2:17
|-  style="background:#fbb;"
| 2010-12-12|| Loss ||align=left| Hirotaka Urabe || Krush -60 kg Inaugural Championship Tournament -First Round- || Tokyo, Japan || Decision (Majority) || 3 || 3:00
|-  bgcolor="#fbb"
| 2010-08-14 || Loss ||align=left| Ryuji Kajiwara || Krush.9 || Tokyo, Japan || Decision (Unanimous) || 3 || 3:00
|-  bgcolor="#fbb"
| 2010-07-05 || Loss ||align=left| Kizaemon Saiga || K-1 WORLD MAX 2010 -63kg Japan Tournament FINAL, Quarter Final || Tokyo, Japan || Decision (Unanimous) || 3 || 3:00
|-  bgcolor="#cfc"
| 2010-05-02 || Win ||align=left| Yuto Watanabe || K-1 WORLD MAX 2010 -63kg Japan Tournament 1st Round || Tokyo, Japan || Decision (Unanimous) || 3 || 3:00
|-  bgcolor="#fbb"
| 2010-01-04 || Loss ||align=left| John Denis || Krush.5 || Tokyo, Japan || KO (3 Knockdowns) || 1 || 2:29
|-  style="background:#cfc;"
| 2009-11-02|| Win||align=left| Yuji Takeuchi || Krush Lightweight Grand Prix 2009, Tournament Semifinals || Tokyo, Japan || KO (Left High Knee)|| 2 || 2:27
|-
! style=background:white colspan=9 |
|-  style="background:#cfc;"
| 2009-08-14|| Win||align=left| Yosuke Mizuochi || Krush Lightweight Grand Prix 2009, Tournament Quarterfinals || Tokyo, Japan || KO (Right High Kick) || 1 || 3:00
|-  style="background:#cfc;"
| 2009-08-14|| Win||align=left| TURBO || Krush Lightweight Grand Prix 2009, Quarterfinals || Tokyo, Japan || KO (Right High Kick) || 3 || 2:45
|-  style="background:#c5d2ea;"
| 2009-06-21|| Draw||align=left| Naoki Maeda || AJKF Norainu Dengekisakusen 2009 || Tokyo, Japan || Decision (Majority) || 5 || 3:00
|-
! style=background:white colspan=9 |
|-  style="background:#cfc;"
| 2009-05-17|| Win||align=left| Daisuke Uematsu || AJKF Krush 3 || Tokyo, Japan || Ext.R Decision (Unanimous) || 4 || 3:00
|-  style="background:#fbb;"
| 2009-03-14|| Loss||align=left| Haruaki Otsuki ||AJKF Krush 2 || Tokyo, Japan || KO (Right Hook) || 3 || 2:37
|-  style="background:#cfc;"
| 2009-01-04|| Win ||align=left| Suafuanlek Sibiugarden ||AJKF NEW Year Kick Festival 2009 || Tokyo, Japan || KO (Left High Knee) || 3 || 0:59
|-  style="background:#cfc;"
| 2008-11-21|| Win ||align=left| Tananchai Sor.Bonchai || Lumpinee Stadium|| Bangkok, Thailand || TKO  || 3 ||
|-  style="background:#fbb;"
| 2008-09-19|| Loss||align=left| Phetek Sor.Suwanpakdee || AJKF SWORD FIGHT 2008 ～Japan VS Thailand～ || Tokyo, Japan || TKO (Doctor Stoppage) || 2 || 2:59
|-  style="background:#fbb;"
| 2008-06-22|| Loss||align=left| Kanongsuk Weerasakreck ||  AJKF Norainu Dengekisakusen  || Tokyo, Japan || KO (Left Body Kick) || 4 || 2:31
|-  style="background:#cfc;"
| 2008-04-26|| Win ||align=left| Genki Yamamoto ||AJKF Spring Storm|| Tokyo, Japan || TKO (Doctor Stoppage)|| 3 || 2:37
|-  style="background:#cfc;"
| 2008-02-09|| Win ||align=left| Shuichi Akabane ||AJKF CUB☆KICK'S-9|| Tokyo, Japan || Decision (Unanimous) || 3 || 3:00
|-  style="background:#cfc;"
| 2008-01-04|| Win ||align=left| Fire Harada ||AJKF New Year Kick Festival 2008|| Tokyo, Japan || KO (Right High Kick) || 2 || 2:04
|-  bgcolor="#fbb"
| 2007-10-25 || Loss ||align=left| Masahiro Yamamoto || AJKF: The Best of 60 kg Tournament 2007 Final, Semi Finals || Tokyo, Japan || Decision (unanimous) || 3 || 3:00
|-  style="background:#cfc;"
| 2007-08-25|| Win ||align=left| Takehiro Murahama || AJKF: The Best of 60 kg Tournament 2007, Opening Round || Tokyo, Japan || Decision (Unanimous) || 3 || 3:00
|-  style="background:#cfc;"
| 2007-06-17|| Win ||align=left| Chagnwitnoi Sitchanwit || Rajadamnern Stadium|| Bangkok, Thailand || TKO (Punches) || 3 ||
|-  bgcolor="#c5d2ea"
| 2007-04-15 || Draw ||align=left| Ryuji Kajiwara || AJKF New Deal || Tokyo, Japan ||  Decision (Majority) || 5 || 3:00
|-  bgcolor="#c5d2ea"
| 2007-01-04 || Draw ||align=left| Wanlop Weerasakreck || AJKF New Year Kick Festival 2007 || Tokyo, Japan ||  Decision (Majority) || 5 || 3:00
|-  bgcolor="#cfc"
| 2006-10-08 || Win ||align=left| Ichiro Otaka || AJKF Seishun Matsuri 〜Naokick's〜 || Tokyo, Japan ||  Decision (Unanimous) || 5 || 3:00
|-  style="background:#cfc;"
| 2006-07-23|| Win||align=left| Masami || AJKF Spear of Destiny || Tokyo, Japan || TKO (3 Knockdowns)|| 1 || 2:24
|-
! style=background:white colspan=9 |
|-  bgcolor="#fbb"
| 2006-05-14 || Loss||align=left| Susumu Daiguji || AJKF CROSSOVER || Tokyo, Japan ||  Decision (Majority)  || 3 || 3:00
|-  bgcolor="#cfc"
| 2006-03-19 || Win ||align=left| Dedduan Por.Jarunchai || AJKF SWORD FIGHT 2006 || Tokyo, Japan ||  Decision (Majority) || 5 || 3:00
|-  style="background:#cfc;"
| 2006-01-04|| Win||align=left| Naoki Maeda|| AJKF New Year Kick Festival 2006 || Tokyo, Japan || TKO (Doctor Stoppage)|| 1 || 3:00 
|-
! style=background:white colspan=9 |
|-  style="background:#cfc;"
| 2005-11-12|| Win||align=left| Rascal Taka|| AJKF Fight Must Go On || Tokyo, Japan || TKO (Doctor Stoppage)|| 2 || 0:57
|-  bgcolor="#fbb"
| 2005-09-19 || Loss ||align=left| Masahiro Yamamoto || IKUSA 2005 –60 kg Grand Prix Final Stage, Final || Tokyo, Japan || TKO (referee stoppage) || 3 || 2:05 
|-
! style=background:white colspan=9 |
|-  bgcolor="#cfc"
| 2005-09-19 || Win||align=left| KAWASAKI || IKUSA 2005 –60 kg Grand Prix Final Stage, Semi Final || Tokyo, Japan || Decision (Majority) || 3 || 3:00
|-  bgcolor="#cfc"
| 2005-06-18 || Win||align=left| TURBO || IKUSA 2005 –60 kg Grand Prix Opening Stage, Quarter Final || Tokyo, Japan || TKO (2 Knockdowns) || 3 || 1:16
|-  bgcolor="#cfc"
| 2005-03-18 || Win||align=left| Liam Rackett || AJKF RUSH! || Tokyo, Japan || TKO (Doctor Stoppage) || 1 ||
|-  bgcolor="#cfc"
| 2005-01-04 || Win||align=left| Naoki Moriyama || AJKF SURVIVOR || Tokyo, Japan || KO (Left Straight) || 1 || 1:40
|-  bgcolor="#fbb"
| 2004-10-17 || Loss ||align=left| Masahiro Yamamoto || AJKF: Hard Blow || Tokyo, Japan || Decision (unanimous) || 5 || 3:00
|-  bgcolor="#cfc"
| 2004-06-18 || Win||align=left| Kenji Takemura || AJKF Japan Lightweight Tournament 2004 FINAL STAGE|| Tokyo, Japan || Decision (unanimous) || 3 || 3:00
|-  bgcolor="#cfc"
| 2004-03-13 || Win||align=left| Akito Iwasa || AJKF Japan Lightweight Tournament 2004 First STAGE|| Tokyo, Japan || Decision (unanimous) || 3 || 3:00
|-  bgcolor="#fbb"
| 2003-09-27 || Loss ||align=left| Genki Yamamoto || AJKF KNOCK DOWN || Tokyo, Japan || TKO (3 Knockdowns) || 2 ||2:12
|-  bgcolor="#cfc"
| 2003-05-23 || Win||align=left| Yoshikazu Murayama || AJKF All Japan Lightweight Tournament 〜Finals〜|| Tokyo, Japan || TKO (Doctor Stoppage) || 2 || 2:55
|-  bgcolor="#cfc"
| 2003-02-07 || Win||align=left| Atsushi Oda || AJKF RED ZONE|| Tokyo, Japan || Decision (Unanimous) || 3 || 3:00
|-  bgcolor="#cfc"
| 2002-11-17 || Win||align=left| Rascal Taka || AJKF BACK FROM HELL-I|| Tokyo, Japan || Decision (Unanimous) || 3 || 3:00
|-  bgcolor="#cfc"
| 2002-09-06 || Win||align=left| Hisanori Maeda || AJKF GOLDEN TRIGGER, All Japan Super Featherweight Tournament Semi Final|| Tokyo, Japan || TKO (Punches) || 3 || 2:54
|-  bgcolor="#cfc"
| 2001-12-09 || Win||align=left| Masaaki Shintaku || AJKF BULLET|| Tokyo, Japan || Decision (Unanimous) || 3 || 3:00
|-  bgcolor="#cfc"
| 2001-07-22 || Win||align=left| Genki Yamamoto || AJKF BLAZE UP|| Tokyo, Japan || Decision (Unanimous) || 3 || 3:00
|-  bgcolor="#cfc"
| 2001-03-16 || Win||align=left| Kang Hyun Kyung || AJKF CROSS FIRE-I|| Tokyo, Japan || Decision (Unanimous) || 3 || 3:00
|-  bgcolor="#c5d2ea"
| 2000-09-13 || Draw||align=left| Genki Yamamoto || AJKF LEGEND-VIII|| Tokyo, Japan || Decision (Unanimous) || 3 || 3:00
|-  bgcolor="#fbb"
| 2000-06-20 || Loss ||align=left| Naoyuki Sugiue || AJKF LEGEND-VI|| Tokyo, Japan || KO || 1 || 0:52
|-  bgcolor="#fbb"
| 2000-04-27 || Loss ||align=left| Yuuho Kohisa || AJKF LEGEND-IV|| Tokyo, Japan || Decision (Unanimous) || 3 || 3:00
|-  bgcolor="#fbb"
| 2000-02-20 || Loss ||align=left| Daisuke Kasahara || AJKF LEGEND-II|| Tokyo, Japan || Decision (Unanimous) || 3 || 3:00
|-  bgcolor="#cfc"
| 2000-01-21 || Win||align=left| Tomoyuki Morishita || AJKF LEGEND-I|| Tokyo, Japan || KO  || 3 || 1:15
|-  bgcolor="#cfc"
| 1999-01-24 || Win||align=left| Hideaki Takama || NJKF || Tokyo, Japan || Decision (Unanimous) || 3 || 3:00
|-
| colspan=9 | Legend:

See also
 List of male kickboxers

References

Living people
1979 births
Japanese male kickboxers
Sportspeople from Tokyo